This is a list of women who have served as viceroys in Canada. Canada is a constitutional monarchy with King Charles III as the reigning Canadian monarch. As the King does not reside in Canada, her daily responsibilities in the country are in the federal jurisdiction undertaken by the Governor General of Canada and by a lieutenant governor in each of the ten provincial jurisdictions. Collectively, these individuals are the King's official viceregal representatives.

This list also includes women who have served as commissioners, an office in each of Canada's three federal territories with similar function to provincial viceroys.

Governors general
A total of four women have served, and one currently serving, as the Governor General of Canada.

Lieutenant governors
A total of twenty-four women have served, or are currently serving, as the lieutenant governor of a province. , there are seven serving provincial female viceroys in Canada.

Territorial commissioners
In each of the three territories of Canada, a commissioner acts as the formal head of state. Unlike the Governor General or a lieutenant governor (who are officially representatives of the Canadian monarch) the commissioners are appointed by and represent the Government of Canada. However, while they are not formally viceroys, they perform in their respective territories the same duties as a provincial lieutenant governor.

A total of thirteen women have served, or are currently serving, as a commissioner; one woman, Helen Maksagak, has served terms as a commissioner in two territories.

See also
 List of female premiers in Canada
 List of elected and appointed female heads of state
 List of Canadian monarchs
 List of Canadian women government ministers

References

Lists of women politicians in Canada

Women